is a lava dome located in the Nipesotsu-Maruyama Volcanic Group of the Ishikari Mountains, Hokkaido, Japan.

See also
 List of volcanoes in Japan
 List of mountains in Japan

External links
 Nipesotsu-Maruyama Volcano Group - Geological Survey of Japan

Nipesotsu
Nipesotsu
Nipesotsu